Alesta is the third studio album recorded by Romanian recording artist Alexandra Stan. It was released both digitally and physically on 9 March 2016 through Victor Entertainment as a follow-up to Unlocked (2014). To achieve her desired sound, Stan collaborated with several producers on the record, including Andreas Schuller, Thomas Troelsen, Sebastian Barac and Marcel Botezan. The singer also took part at a music camp organized by Marius Moga, where she further worked on material featured on the album. Musically, Alesta, a dance record, draws influence from ethnic, Eastern and Western European music. Lyrically, Stan confessed during an interview with Cosmopolitan that every recording "[tells] a different story".

Upon its release, Alesta debuted and peaked at number 34 on the Japanese Oricon Albums Chart. Five tracks from the album were released as singles, with "We Wanna"—a collaboration with Inna and Daddy Yankee—reaching the top 60 in several countries. "I Did It, Mama!" was accompanied by a controversial music video, and experienced commercial success in her native country. Fellow singles "Balans", "Écoute" and "9 Lives" portrayed featurings with Swedish-Congolese singer Mohombi, Romanian band Havana and Bulgarian reggae performer Jahmmi, respectively. To promote Alesta, Stan embarked on a two-week venue in Japan, while appearing in many interviews and media coverages there.

Background and composition
Following the release of Unlocked in 2014, Stan commenced working on Alesta the subsequent year at a Romanian music camp organized by Romanian composer Marius Moga; there she collaborated with three recording studios simultaneously. The title of the record is an abbreviation of Stan's stage name, also meaning 'ready' in Turkish. The accompanying artwork for the Japanese and other versions of the album show Stan posing in front of a black backdrop, with lettering displayed in white or red above her head. Editions of Alesta released by Ego Records and Warner Bros. Records featured a photograph with her laying over a motorcycle sporting a blonde wig, white underwear and a distorted pair of blue jeans.

According to Stan's Italian label, Ego Records, the material from Alesta draws influence from Eastern and Western European music, which "confirms her as the undisputed queen of dance music made in Romania". Italian publication RnB Junk labelled the album as a dance record, comparing it to the singer's Unlocked, and stating that it incorporates elements of ethnic and Eastern European music "from other universes". When interviewed by Cosmopolitan, Stan confessed that her favorite track from the album was "Écoute", with every single track "telling a different story". In an interview with TV Groove, the singer felt that the "summerish" record had a "very danceable and partying vibe". According to Stan, most of the songs on Alesta are uptempo, and the album overall incorporates genres of electronic pop, dance and R&B music. The majority of the tracks are sung in English, with some songs performed in French, Romanian and Spanish, as well.

Promotion
 To promote Alesta, Stan performed in Tokyo, Japan, in the vitrine of a Bershka shop, where she also released her clothes line, Alesta X Bershka. With this occasion, the singer hosted an autograph session and a press conference with Japanese magazines and televisions from Nagoya and Tokyo. Subsequently, Stan embarked on a two-week tour throughout Japan. Stan further performed material from the album at the 22nd Tokyo Girls Collection, Zippie Dance Party, YouTube Space Tokyo and YouTube Live during March 2016.

The first single from the record—"We Wanna"— was released on 8 June 2015 and featured the vocals of Romanian recording artist Inna and Puerto Rican reggaeton performer Daddy Yankee. With it being previously featured on the German edition of Stan's second studio album Unlocked, the track experienced commercial success when reaching the top 30 of the charts in Argentina, Poland and Turkey, and the top 60 in Italy, Romania and Slovakia. Subsequently, "I Did It, Mama!"—the second release off Alesta—became controversial in Romania because of scenes where Stan was portrayed miming the sexual intercourse with a male background dancer in its music video. While its lyrical message was compared to Madonna's "Papa Don't Preach" (1986) and its title to Delia Matache's "Da Mama" (2013), the recording charted at number nine on native Airplay 100.

The record's third and fourth singles were "Balans", a collaboration with Swedish-Congolese singer Mohombi, and "Écoute", featuring with Romanian band Havana; both songs benefited of a music video, with the clip for the latter single being filmed in Obârșia-Brezoi, the place where Stan spent her youth. "Balans" peaked on both Russia's Tophit and the Japanese Radio Chart at lower positions, and "Écoute" became a minor success in Europe. The fifth release from the album, "Boom Pow", was accompanied by a music video which was shot in her native Constanța and premiered on 24 August 2016, while "9 Lives", the last single, featured collaborative vocals from Bulgarian reggae performer Jahmmi.

Track listings
Credits adapted from the liner notes of Alesta.

Credits and personnel
Credits adapted from the liner notes of Alesta.

Vocal credits
 Alexandra Stan – lead vocals, featured artist
 Dorian – lead vocals
 Havana – featured artist
 Inna – featured artist
 Follow Your Instinct – lead vocals
 Jahmmi – featured artist
 Daddy Yankee – featured artist

Technical and composing credits
 Sebastian Arman – composer, producer
 Ramon Ayala – composer
 Sebastian Barac – composer, producer
 Gabriel Benjamin – composer
 Marcel Botezan – composer, producer
 Trey Campbell – composer
 Ion Chirinciuc – composer, producer
 David Ciente – composer, producer
 Nate Cyphert – composer
 Davon Dixon – composer
 Andrew Frampton – composer
 Patrick Greska – composer, producer
 Breyan Isaac – composer
 Jacob Luttrell – composer
 Theea-Eliza-Ioana Miculescu – composer
 Dorian Micu – composer
 Andrei Mihai – composer, producer
 Borislav Milanov – composer
 Mohombi Nzasi Moupondo – composer
 Elena Moroşanu – composer
 Addis Mussa – composer
 Manuela Necker – composer
 Julimar Santos Oliveira Neponuceno – composer
 Andrei Nemirschi – composer
 Joacim Persson – composer, producer
 Marcel Prodan – composer
 David Ritter – composer, producer
 Andreas Schuller – composer, producer
 Marcian Alin Soare – composer
 Adriana Rusu – composer
 Laila Samuelsen – composer
 Sorin Seniuc – composer
 Alexandra Stan – composer
 Nadir Tamuz – composer
 Alexandra Ţîrţîrău – composer
 Thomas Troelsen – composer, producer
 Eric Turner – composer
 Rainer Wetenkamp – composer, producer

Charts

Release

Process
Alesta was first released by Victor Entertainment in Japan on 9 March 2016; a deluxe version of the album premiered on the same day. Subsequently, on 16 March 2016, the record was made available for digital download in various other countries by Roton and Global Records, including Romania, France, Germany, Canada and the United Kingdom. In April 2016, Alesta was released in Russia, Chile and Peru, while its Italian release was on 8 July 2016 through Ego Records.

History

Notes

References

2016 albums
Alexandra Stan albums